The Codex Iuliacensis is a mediaeval book, dating to about 1320 to 1350. The adjective "Iuliacensis" refers to the Rhenish town of Jülich, Latin "Iuliacum", formerly capital of the county / duchy of the same name.

The Codex Iuliacensis is written in Latin and is now being kept at the Library of the Diocese of Aachen (Aix-la-Chapelle). The Codex is famous for its description of Blessed Christina von Stommeln and the first record of a woman to have received the stigmata.

References
P. Nieveler, Codex Iuliacensis; Christina von Stommeln und Petrus von Dacien. Leben und Nachleben in Geschichte und Literatur (Mönchengladbach 1975)  
Christine Ruhrberg, Der literarische Korper der Heiligen: Leben und Viten der Christina von Stommeln (1242-1312) (Tübingen 1995), Ch. 2

14th-century books
Latin prose texts